Edwin Sydney Vanspaul Henry (born 24 September 1992) is an Indian professional footballer who plays as a midfielder or defender for Chennaiyin in the Indian Super League.

Early career
Son of a sports enthusiast, Edwin Sydney grew up watching his father play one or the another game daily. But football attracted him the most, and since his 5th grade, he started playing football. Unfortunately, Edwin failed to clear his 12th exam and joined Loyola College, Chennai. Chennai Football Association (CFA) senior division team Indian Bank used to train at Loyola College, and Edwin got an opportunity to train with the team, soon they signed him for CFA senior division league.

Career

Indian Bank
Edwin made his debut in CFA senior division in 2010 when he started and played as a striker against Central Excise. Indian Bank won the game three goals to nil. The Neyveli born footballer went on to score 3 goals in 28 appearances for Indian Bank during 2010-2013, before he moved to Chennai FC.

Chennai FC
Edwin shifted to central midfield at Chennai FC, and debuted in the game against Indian Arrows which Chennai FC went on to win 3–0. The midfielder went on to score 6 goals in 22 appearances for Chennai FC during 2014–2015 season.

Chennai City
Edwin joined Chennai City in 2016, where he played as a winger primarily. He scored 8  goals in 22 appearances in the CFA Senior Division league between 2016 and 2017.
 
In 2016 Chennai City entered I-league as direct entrants, and signed Edwin soon after. On 21 January 2017 Vanspaul made his professional debut in the I-League for Chennai City against Mohun Bagan. He started and played 68 minutes as Chennai City lost 2–1. Edwin went on to play 12 games during the season in total. In 2017-18 I-League season, under V. Soundararajan, Edwin's position was constantly shifted from central midfield to left back or right wing. Despite the poor performance of the team, Edwin caught the eye with his accurate passing ability.

In 2018-19 season, he was integral in helping Chennai City win their maiden I-League title. Edwins's performance was highly praised and helped him gain interest from many ISL clubs.

Chennaiyin
In the 2019 Summer Transfer Window, former Indian Super League champions and his home state club Chennaiyin signed him permanently. He would play 20 times during the season, primarily as a right back and in center midfield later in the season due to the emergence of Laldinliana Renthlei.

Career statistics

Club

Honours

Club
Chennai City
I-League: 2018–19
Chennaiyin
Indian Super League: runner-up 2019–20

References

Living people
People from Cuddalore district
Indian footballers
Chennai City FC players
Association football midfielders
Footballers from Tamil Nadu
I-League players
1992 births
Indian Super League players
Chennaiyin FC players